Pennsylvania Route 120 (PA 120) is a state highway in the U.S. state of Pennsylvania, running from U.S. Route 219 (US 219) in Ridgway east to US 220 near Lock Haven.

Bucktail State Park Natural Area

In much of Cameron and Clinton counties, PA 120 is a Pennsylvania Scenic Byway designated the Bucktail State Park Natural Area. Bucktail State Park Natural Area runs 75 miles (121 km) from Emporium to Lock Haven, and is named for the Pennsylvania Bucktails Regiment, who came from the area during the American Civil War. PA 120 and the park run along Sinnemahoning Creek and the West Branch Susquehanna River and also pass through Renovo (in Clinton County).

Bucktail State Park Natural Area was established by the Pennsylvania State Legislature in 1933. While much of the land is state owned and part of the Elk and Sproul State Forests, there are also many tracts of privately owned land within the official boundaries of the park. The law establishing the park defined its boundaries as "all that area of land extending in length from the western city line of Lock Haven, in Clinton County, to the eastern borough line of Emporium, in The County of Cameron, and along the course of the western branch of the Susquehanna River, and its tributary, Sinnemahoning Creek, in Clinton and Cameron counties, an estimated distance of 75 miles, and in width from mountain rim to mountain rim across the valley." The park is primarily dedicated to wildlife viewing, especially elk.

History

PA 120 follows an old Native American Trail, the Sinnemahoning Path. This trail was used by Native Americans to cross the eastern continental divide (specifically the Allegheny Front) between the Susquehanna River (which drains into the Chesapeake Bay) and the Allegheny River (which forms the Ohio River with the Monongahela River at Pittsburgh and eventually drains into the Gulf of Mexico via the Mississippi River). American Pioneers also used the trail to make their way west and it was also known as the Bucktail Trail.

PA 120 was U.S. Route 120 until ca. 1967. US 120 was initially planned in 1926 as an Erie–Philadelphia route, but was truncated to Ridgway–Reading in 1927, the route west of Ridgway primarily becoming an extension of US 6 and that to the east of Reading becoming the eastern segment of US 422. The portion east of Lock Haven of the remainder of the route became US 220, US 15, and US 122 ca. 1935; this alignment is now roughly followed by US 220, I-180, PA 147, and PA 61.

Major intersections

See also

References

External links

Pennsylvania Highways: PA 120
Pennsylvania Highways: History of U.S. Route 120
Endpoints of historic U.S. Highway 120 at USEnds.com

 1
120
Transportation in Elk County, Pennsylvania
Transportation in Cameron County, Pennsylvania
Transportation in Clinton County, Pennsylvania